Your Face Sounds Familiar is a Greek reality show airing on ANT1. The fourth season started on April 23, 2017. The contestants are evaluated by the show's judges, the audience and the other contestants. The contestant who gathers the highest score in each live (winner of the night), is able to donate the money that is collected from the audience's voting to a charity of their choice. In Cyprus, the money were given to "Pankypria Organosi Tyflon" (Pancyprian Organization of the Blind People) organization every week.

Cast

Host and Judges 
The host of the show was Maria Bekatorou and the four judges will be Elli Kokkinou, Stamatis Fassoulis, Fotis Sergoulopoulos and Nikos Moutsinas.

Contestants 
Ten contestants in total competed in the fourth season; four women and six men:

Performances

Week 1 
The premiere aired on April 23, 2017 and winner of the first live was Isaias with 22 points. Isaias chose to give the money from the audience voting to the organization "Syllogos Iliachtida" in Agrinio.

After the judges and contestants' scores, Giannis Chatzigeorgiou, Giannis Chatzopoulos and Antonis were tied with 24 points. Kokkinou, who was the president of the judges for the week, chose to give the final 6 points to Giannis Chatzopoulos, the 5 points to Antonis and the 4 points to Giannis Chatzigeorgiou. After the combined final scores, two contestants had 14 points and other three had 12 points. In each tie, the one who got the highest score from the audience got the highest final place and the one with the lowest got the lowest place.

Week 2 
The second episode aired on April 30, 2017 and the winner was Giannis Chatzigeorgiou with 22 points. Chatzigeorgiou chose to give the money from audience to "The Smile of the Child". After the combined final scores, two contestants had 23 points and two contestants had 11 points. The one who got the highest score from the audience got the highest final place out of the two in both situations.

The Secret Guest of the evening was Dimitris Ouggarezos, who transformed into Elvis Presley and sang "Viva Las Vegas".

Week 3: Eurovision Night 
The third episode aired on May 7, 2017 and the winner was Isaias with 21 points. Isaias chose to give the money from the audience voting to the organization "Syllogos Iliachtida" in Agrinio. After the combined final scores, two contestants had 19 points. The one who got the highest score from the audience got the highest final place out of the two in both situations.

The Secret Guests of the evening were Loukas Giorkas, who helped Dimitris Makalias with his transformation and sang his song "Watch My Dance" and Alexis Kostalas, the long-time Greek spokesman who announced the votes for Greece between 1998 and 2010.

Also, Fotis Sergoulopoulos transformed into Alexander Rybak and sang "Fairytale", the 2009 winning song.

Week 4 
The fourth episode aired on May 14, 2017 and the winner was Parthena with 23 points. Parthena chose to give the money from the audience voting to the organization "Agia Marina" in Kavala.

The guests of the evening were Zeta Makripoulia, who replaced Elli Kokkinou due to Kokkinou's business commitments and the cast of the musical Evita.

Week 5 
The fifth episode aired on May 25, 2017 and the winner was Aris with 24 points. Aris chose to give the money from the audience voting to the organization "Kethea-Orizontes" in Athens.

The guests of the evening were Thanasis Alevras, who replaced Fotis Sergoulopoulos due to Sergoulopoulos' planned trip and Kostas Voutsas who helped Dimitris Makalias during his performance.

Week 6 
The sixth episode aired on June 1, 2017 and the winner was Aris with 24 points. Aris chose to give the money from the audience voting to the organization "Kethea-Orizontes" in Athens. After the combined final scores, three contestants had 17 points and two contestants had 9 points. The one who got the highest score from the audience got the highest final place out of the two in both situations.

Week 7 
The seventh episode aired on June 8, 2017 and the winner was Giannis Chatzigeorgiou with 22 points. Chatzigeorgiou chose to give the money from audience to "The Smile of the Child". After the combined final scores, two contestants had 16 points and two contestants had 13 points. The one who got the highest score from the audience got the highest final place out of the two in both situations. Also, Elli Kokkinou song her new song "To Parapono mou"

Week 8 
The eighth episode aired on June 15, 2017 and the winner was Antonis with 23 points. Antonis chose to give the money from audience to "Syllogos Philanthropikon" in Andros. After the combined final scores, two contestants had 20 points and two contestants had 14 points. The one who got the highest score from the audience got the highest final place out of the two in both situations.

Week 9 
The ninth episode aired on June 22, 2017 and the winner was Antonis with 18 points. Antonis chose to give the money from audience to "Syllogos Philanthropikon" in Andros. After the combined final scores, four contestants had 18 points, two contestants had 16 and two contestants had 7 points. The one who got the highest score from the audience got the highest final place out of the two in both situations.

Week 10 
The tenth episode aired on June 29, 2017 and the winner was Konnie with 24 points. Konnie chose to give the money from audience to "Stray.gr" in Athens. After the combined final scores two contestants had 14 points. The one who got the highest score from the audience got the highest final place out of the two in both situations.

Week 11: Semi-finals 
The eleventh episode aired on July 6, 2017 and the winner was Antonis with 24 points. Antonis chose to give the money from audience to "Syllogos Philanthropikon" in Andros. After the combined final scores, three contestants had 20 points, two contestants had 13 points and two contestants had 9 points. The one who got the highest score from the audience got the highest final place out of the two in both situations.

The Secret Guest of the evening was Katerina Stikoudi, who transformed into Natassa Bofiliou and sang En Lefko.

In the semi-finals, the four contestants with the highest cumulative scores from all 11 weeks were announced and were the ones to compete in the finals. The four finalists were; Giannis Chatzigeorgiou with 200 points, Isaias Matiaba with 196 points, Aris Makris with 190 points and Parthena Horozidou with 188 points. The remaining six players will perform in duets but they will not get scored. It was also the last time the judges were going to score the contestants since the winner is decided only by the audience.

Week 12: Finals 
The twelfth and final live aired on July 13, 2017 and the winner of the show was Giannis Chatzigeorgiou. The income from the audience voting for the final, was divided in ten equal parts and was given to all ten foundations that the contestants were representing during the twelve live shows.

At the beginning of the show, Bekatorou performed the song "Den Kanei Kryo stin Ellada" by Locomondo.

The six contestants who did not compete in the finals, received a special award for their participation on the show.

Notes
 1.  The points that judges gave in order (Moutsinas, Kokkinou, Fasoulis, Sergoulopoulos).
 2.  Each contestant gave 5 points to a contestant of their choice.
 3.  Total of both extra and judges' score.
 4.  Result of both extra and judges' score.
 5.  In the final, only the audience voted for the winner and the one with the most votes won the competition.

Results chart 

 indicates the contestant came first that week.
 indicates the contestant came last that week.
 performed but didn't score
 indicates the winning contestant.
 indicates the runner-up contestant.
 indicates the third-place contestant.
 indicates the fourth-place contestant.

Ratings

References

External links 
 Official website of Your Face Sounds Familiar
 Facebook page of Your Face Sounds Familiar
 Twitter of Your Face Sounds Familiar

Greek 4
2017 Greek television seasons